Ruben Campolo is an Argentine former footballer and football manager who played as a goalkeeper.

Career 
Campolo played Chacarita Juniors and had stints in Belgium and Germany. In 1979, he played in the North American Soccer League with Memphis Rogues. He made his debut for Memphis on April 14, 1979 against Detroit Express. In 1989, he served as an assistant coach for Montreal Supra in the Canadian Soccer League. In 1990, he was named the head coach for Toronto Italia in the National Soccer League.

References 

Living people
Argentine footballers
Argentine football managers
Association football goalkeepers
Chacarita Juniors footballers
Memphis Rogues players
North American Soccer League (1968–1984) players
Canadian National Soccer League coaches
Year of birth missing (living people)